Duoc UC is an accredited, non-profit private institute of higher education in Chile. It was founded under the umbrella of the Pontificia Universidad Católica de Chile in 1968, which provides technical and professional degrees through practical and industry-focused programs.

Nowadays it has 20 campuses, more than 103,000 students and ca. 3,169 teachers. Its rector is Carlos Díaz Vergara.

History
Duoc UC was founded in 1968 under the name "Worker Farmer University Department of the Pontifical Catholic University of Chile" (Departamento Universitario Obrero Campesino de la Pontificia Universidad Católica de Chile) in order to give free education to students from lower social backgrounds, children of workers and farmers in particular. This practice was already being conducted by the University of Chile and especially the State Technical University (UTE), which was immersed in the era of university reform university classrooms opened to workers and low-income students who could study technical courses at universities despite economic shortcomings.

Duoc grew rapidly and a year after its foundation it already had one campus and 475 students. The following year, the campuses tripled, and the number of students grew to 3,033. In 1972 Duoc UC already had 30,000 students enrolled in its courses and programs. The growth achieved in its early years prompted the Pontifical Catholic University of Chile to give legal autonomy and management, approving the creation of the Duoc Foundation, on 7 September 1973.

Locations 
The institution's schools are present in 5 of the 16 Regions of Chile (2023).

The patrimonial and university extension building of Santiago can also be seen virtually.

Schools and programs
Currently, DuocUC has 9 schools distributed over 20 campuses (2023) where Professional and Technical level careers are taught: 

 School of Administration and Business
 School of Communication
 School of Construction
 School of Design
 School of Gastronomy
 School of Informatics and Telecommunications
 School of Engineering and Natural Resources
 School of Health
 School of Tourism and Hospitality

Specialization and continuing education 
Through the specialization programs, people and companies can opt for different courses, diplomas and also study plans, transforming them into complete study plans that allow the student to articulate and validate careers of the institution or also to focus them on their professional development.

Extension and Branches UC 
See the main list with hyperlinks available in: Duoc UC on spanish wikipedia.

International Networks 
Duoc UC is an important actor within the Professional Technical field at a global and national level, being part of important international networks, thus providing opportunities for development and professional improvement to our students and foreign students:

Membership in International Networks 
World federation of colleges and polytechnics
International Association of Universities and Colleges of Art Media and Design 
International Council of Design
International Council of Societies of Industrial Design (WDO)
Audio Engineering Society
Global University Network for Innovation
Global Alliance for Public Relations and Communication Management
International Medical Informatics Association
The Broadcast Education Association
Inter-American Centre for Knowledge Development in Vocational Training
SUNY COIL Network
Design Factory Global Network

International Accreditation 
The School of Design became accredited by the National Association of Schools of Art and Design (NASAD) in 2015

In 2015 the English Program at Duoc UC achieved the Oxford Quality Gold Category from Oxford University Press

In 2012 our Biomedical Computing program received internacional accreditation by the International Medical Informatics Association.

Collaborative Projects 
Design Factory Duoc UC Design Factory is a Space of Collaborative Innovation based on the Design Factory model from the Aalto University in Finland. This center encourages the students' training and creativity as the fundamental component of the skills to innovate.

The Design Factory Global Network (DFGN) currently operates in eleven institutions of higher education around the world. The objective of this network and its partner members is to be the leader in international university collaboration, beyond academic boundaries.

Institutional bond 

 Pontificia Universidad Católica de Chile
 Archbishop of Santiago
 Anexed to Pontifical University, Holy See, Vatican State

Notable alumni 
María Elena Swett, Chilean actress.
Patricio "Pato" Escala Pierart, Chilean animator and film producer.
Fernanda Urrejola, Chilean actress.

External links 

Duoc UC Official Web Site 
Duoc UC English Website 
Learn Chile 
Wikimedia Commons multimedia about Duoc UC

Gallery

References

1968 in Chile
Education in Chile
Pontifical Catholic University of Chile
Pontifical universities
Universities and colleges in South America
Universities in Chile
Education in South America
Educational institutions in Chile
Science and technology in Chile